Giuseppe Mazzotta (born January 1, 1942) is an American historian of Italy, currently the Sterling Professor in the Humanities for Italian at Yale University, and also a published author. Mazzotta served as president of the Dante Society of America from 2003-2009.

Early life and education
He was born at Curinga, Italy on January 1, 1942. He received a B.A. from University of Toronto in 1965, a M.A. from University of Toronto in 1966 and a PH.D. from Cornell University in 1969.

Career
Originally from Italy, he has served at the Yale University since 1986 and also served as the Emilio Goggio Visiting Professor at University of Toronto in 2014.

Works
Reading Dante (2014)
Encyclopaedia Mundi - Studi di letteratura italiana in onore di Giuseppe Mazzotta (2013)
Modern Language Notes (MLN) - Italian Issue Supplement, Volume 127, Number 1, January 2012 (2012)
Cosmopoiesis: Renessansens prosjekt (2009)
Cosmopoiesis: Il progetto del Rinascimento (2008)
Inferno Dante Alighieri (2007)
Cosmopoiesis: The Renaissance Experiment (2001)
The New Map of the World (1999)
La nuova mappa del mondo: La filosofia poetica di Giambattista Vico (1999)
The Worlds of Petrarch, Duke Monographs in Medieval and Renaissance Studies (1993) {Rev.}
Dante’s Vision and the Circle of Knowledge (1993)
Dante, Poet of the Desert: History and Allegory in the Divine Comedy (1979)
– Source:

References

Living people
21st-century American historians
21st-century American male writers
Yale University faculty
Yale Sterling Professors
1942 births
Giambattista Vico scholars
American male non-fiction writers